Banff Bridge railway station was a railway station in Banff Bridge, Banff, Aberdeenshire. It was the penultimate stop on a branch line from Inveramsay to Macduff.

Another branch from Tillynaught railway station terminated at a separate station in Banff.

Passenger services were withdrawn after 30 September 1951.

References

Disused railway stations in Aberdeenshire
Railway stations in Great Britain opened in 1872
Railway stations in Great Britain closed in 1951
Former Great North of Scotland Railway stations
Banff, Aberdeenshire
1951 disestablishments in Scotland